Ben Jonson Journal is a biannual academic journal published by Edinburgh University Press in Scotland, in May and November of each year. It was established in 1993. It covers the study of Ben Jonson and the culture in which his literary efforts thrived.

External links
 

1993 establishments in Scotland
Biannual journals
English-language journals
Edinburgh University Press academic journals
Literary magazines published in Scotland
Jonson, Ben
Publications established in 1993